Mesopithecus ("middle monkey" for being between Hylobates and Semnopithecus in build) is an extinct genus of Old World monkey that lived in Europe and Asia 7 to 5 million years ago. 
It was adapted to both walking and climbing, possessing a slender body with long, muscular limbs and flexible fingers. Its teeth suggest that it primarily ate soft leaves and fruit. It was once thought that these extinct monkeys might be an ancestor of the grey langur, but a study in 2004 suggested that they are more closely related to the snub-nosed monkeys and doucs.

Gallery

References

External links
 Rare Mesopithecus skull unearthed in Chalkidiki

Prehistoric monkeys
Miocene primates of Europe
Pliocene primates
Miocene primates of Asia
Prehistoric primate genera
Prehistoric mammals of Europe
Fossil taxa described in 1839